Holistic education is a movement in education that seeks to engage all aspects of the learner, including mind, body, and spirit. Its philosophy, which is also identified as holistic learning theory, is based on the premise that each person finds identity,  meaning, and purpose in life through connections to their local community, to the natural world, and to humanitarian values such as compassion and peace. 

Holistic education aims to call forth from people an intrinsic reverence for life and a passionate love of learning, gives attention to experiential learning, and places significance on "relationships and primary human values within the learning environment".
The term "holistic education" is most often used to refer to the more democratic and humanistic types of alternative education.

Background
 

Holistic education's origins has been associated with the emergence of the concept of instruction in ancient Greece and other indigenous cultures. This involved the method that focused on the whole person instead of one or some segments of an individual's experience. It formed part of the view that the world is a single whole and that learning cannot be separated from all of man's experiences.

The term holistic education has been attributed to the South African military leader, statesman, scholar and philosopher, Field Marshal General Jan Christiaan Smuts (1870-1950), who is noted for his role in the foundation of the League of Nations, and the formation of the international peace organization, the United Nations. He drew from the ancient Greek conceptualization of holistic education to propose a modern philosophy of learning.

Smuts is considered the founder of "Holism", which he derived from the Greek word ολος, which means "whole". In his 1926 book Holism and Evolution, Smuts describes "holism" as the tendency in nature to form wholes that are greater than the sum of the parts through creative evolution.  Today, this work is recognized as the foundation theory for systems thinking, complexity theory, neural networks, semantic holism, holistic education, and the general systems theory in ecology.  Smuts' "holism" was also the inspiration for Emile Durkheim's concept of the "holistic society", as well as Alfred Adler's psychological approach, which views the individual as an "integrated whole".

There are also sources that credit Rudolph Steiner, John Dewey, and Maria Montessori as the originator of the modern model of holistic education. Steiner, particularly, developed a holistic education framework based on the works of Johann Wolfgang von Goethe and H.P. Blavatsky. It introduced the concept of "imaginative teaching" and its role in the learner's self-actualization.

Development
It is difficult to map the history of holistic education, as in some respects its core ideas are not new but "timeless and found in the sense of wholeness in humanity's religious impetus". 

The explicit application of holistic ideas to education has a clear tradition, however, whose originating theorists include: 
Jean-Jacques Rousseau, 
Ralph Waldo Emerson, 
Henry Thoreau, 
Bronson Alcott, 
Johann Pestalozzi, and
Friedrich Fröbel. 

More recent theorists are Rudolf Steiner, 
Maria Montessori, 
Francis Parker, 
John Dewey, 
Francisco Ferrer
John Caldwell Holt, 
George Dennison 
Kieran Egan, 
Howard Gardner, 
Jiddu Krishnamurti, 
Carl Jung, 
Abraham Maslow, 
Carl Rogers, 
Paul Goodman, 
Ivan Illich, and 
Paulo Freire.

Many scholars feel the modern "look and feel" of holistic education coalesced through two factors: the rise of humanist philosophies after World War II and the cultural paradigm shift beginning in the mid-1960s. In the 1970s, after the holism movement in psychology became much more mainstream, "an emerging body of literature in science, philosophy and cultural history provided an overarching concept to describe this way of understanding education – a perspective known as holism."

In July 1979, the first National Holistic Education Conference took place at the University of California at San Diego. The conference was presented by The Mandala Society and The National Center for the Exploration of Human Potential and was titled Mind: Evolution or Revolution? The Emergence of Holistic Education. For six years after, the Holistic Education Conference was combined with the Mandala Holistic Health Conferences at the University of California, San Diego.  About three thousand professionals participated each year. Out of these conferences came the annual Journals of Holistic Health. Holistic education began taking form as an identifiable area of study and practice in the mid-1980s in North America. Since the early 2000s, some of the historically separate academic areas, Science, Technology, Engineering, and Mathematics (STEM) on the one hand, and the Humanities, Arts, and Social Sciences (HASS) on the other, have found new holistic common ground, as demonstrated in consensus reports on Integrating Social and Behavioral Sciences Within the Weather Enterprise (2018) and The Integration of the Humanities and Arts with Sciences, Engineering, and Medicine in Higher Education. Branches from the Same Tree (2018).

Philosophical framework for holistic education
Holistic education aims at helping students be the most that they can be. Abraham Maslow referred to this as "self-actualization". Education with a holistic perspective is concerned with the development of every person's intellectual, emotional, social, physical, artistic, creative and spiritual potentials. It seeks to engage students in the teaching/learning process and encourages personal and collective responsibility.

In describing the general philosophy of holistic education, Robin Ann Martin and Scott Forbes (2004) divided their discussion into two categories: the idea of "ultimacy" and Basil Bernstein's notion of sagacious competence.

Ultimacy
Religious; as in becoming "enlightened". You see the light out of difficulties and challenges. This can be done through increased spirituality. Spirituality is an important component in holistic education as it emphasizes the connectedness of all living things and stresses the "harmony between the inner life and outer life".
Psychological; as in Maslow's "self-actualization". Holistic education believes that each person should strive to be all that they can be in life. There are no deficits in learners, just differences.
Undefined; as in a person developing to the ultimate extent a human could reach and, thus, moving towards the highest aspirations of the human spirit.

Sagacious competence
Freedom (in a psychological sense).
Good-judgment (self-governance).
Meta learning (each student learns in their "own way").
Social ability (more than just learning social skills).
Refining Values (development of character).
Self Knowledge (emotional development).

Curriculum
An application of holistic education to a curriculum has been described as transformational learning where the instruction recognizes the wholeness of the learner and that he and the curriculum are not seen as separate but connected. According to John Miller, the position is similar to the Quaker belief that there is "that of God in every one".

Various attempts to articulate the central themes of a holistic education, seeking to educate the whole person, have been made:

 In holistic education the basic three R's have been said to be education for: Relationships, Responsibility and Reverence for all life.

 First, children need to learn about themselves. This involves learning self-respect and self-esteem. Second, children need to learn about relationships. In learning about their relationships with others, there is a focus on social "literacy" (learning to see social influence) and emotional "literacy" (one's own self in relation to others). Third, children need to learn about resilience. This entails overcoming difficulties, facing challenges and learning how to ensure long-term success. Fourth, children need to learn about aesthetics – This encourages the student to see the beauty of what is around them and learn to have awe in life.

 Curriculum is derived from the teacher listening to each child and helping the child bring out what lies within oneself.

Tools/teaching strategies of holistic education
With the goal of educating the whole child, holistic education promotes several strategies to address the question of how to teach and how people learn. First, the idea of holism advocates a transformative approach to learning. Rather than seeing education as a process of transmission and transaction, transformative learning involves a change in the frames of reference that a person might have. This change may include points of view, habits of mind, and worldviews. Holism understands knowledge as something that is constructed by the context in which a person lives. Therefore, teaching students to reflect critically on how we come to know or understand information is essential. As a result, if "we ask students to develop critical and reflective thinking skills and encourage them to care about the world around them they may decide that some degree of personal or social transformation is required."

Second, the idea of connections is emphasized as opposed to the fragmentation that is often seen in mainstream education. This fragmentation may include the dividing of individual subjects, dividing students into grades, etc. Holism sees the various aspects of life and living as integrated and connected, therefore, education should not isolate learning into several different components. Martin (2002) illustrates this point further by stating that, "Many alternative educators argue instead that who the learners are, what they know, how they know it, and how they act in the world are not separate elements, but reflect the interdependencies between our world and ourselves". Included in this idea of connections is the way that the classroom is structured. Holistic school classrooms are often small and consist of mixed-ability and mixed-age students. They are flexible in terms of how they are structured so that if it becomes appropriate for a student to change classes, (s)he is moved regardless of what time of year it is on the school calendar. Flexible pacing is key in allowing students to feel that they are not rushed in learning concepts studied, nor are they held back if they learn concepts quickly.

Third, along the same thread as the idea of connections in holistic education, is the concept of transdisciplinary inquiry. Transdisciplinary inquiry is based on the premise that division between disciplines is eliminated. One must understand the world in wholes as much as possible and not in fragmented parts. "Transdisciplinary approaches involve multiple disciplines and the space between the disciplines with the possibility of new perspectives 'beyond' those disciplines. Where multidisciplinary and interdisciplinary inquiry may focus on the contribution of disciplines to an inquiry transdisciplinary inquiry tends to focus on the inquiry issue itself."

Fourth, holistic education proposes that meaningfulness is also an important factor in the learning process. People learn better when what is being learned is important to them. Holistic schools seek to respect and work with the meaning structures of each person. Therefore, the start of a topic would begin with what a student may know or understand from their worldview, what has meaning to them rather than what others feel should be meaningful to them. Meta-learning is another concept that connects to meaningfulness. In finding inherent meaning in the process of learning and coming to understand how they learn, students are expected to self-regulate their own learning. However, they are not completely expected to do this on their own. Because of the nature of community in holistic education, students learn to monitor their own learning through interdependence on others inside and outside of the classroom.

Finally, as mentioned above, community is an integral aspect in holistic education. As relationships and learning about relationships are keys to understanding ourselves, so the aspect of community is vital in this learning process. Scott Forbes stated, "In holistic education the classroom is often seen as a community, which is within the larger community of the school, which is within the larger community of the village, town, or city, and which is, by extension, within the larger community of humanity."

Teacher's role
In holistic education, the teacher is seen less as person of authority who leads and controls but rather is seen as "a friend, a mentor, a facilitator, or an experienced traveling companion". Schools should be seen as places where students and adults work toward a mutual goal. Open and honest communication is expected and differences between people are respected and appreciated. Cooperation is the norm, rather than competition. Thus, many schools incorporating holistic beliefs do not give grades or rewards. The reward of helping one another and growing together is emphasized rather than being placed above one another.

See also

Deschooling
Holism
Homeschooling
Unschooling

School movements that incorporate elements of holistic education

Camphill Schools
Democratic school and anarchistic free school
Forest School
Friends/Quaker Schools
Krishnamurti Schools
Montessori School
Reggio Emilia Inspired Schools
Waldorf Education (or Steiner Education)

Note on semantics
There is a debate on whether holistic education is connected to the idea of holistic education which is used to refer to education in holistic health or spiritual practices such as massage and yoga. Some educators feel that holistic education is a part of holistic practices, while others feel that they are totally separate concepts.

Notes

Philosophy of education